Strictly Come Dancing returned for its fourteenth series with a launch show on 3 September on BBC One, with the live shows starting on 23 September 2016. Tess Daly and Claudia Winkleman returned as hosts, while Zoe Ball returned to host Strictly Come Dancing: It Takes Two on BBC Two. Len Goodman, Bruno Tonioli, Craig Revel Horwood and Darcey Bussell returned as judges. This was Goodman's final series as head judge.

The series was won by BBC Sport presenter Ore Oduba and Joanne Clifton. Oduba became the first champion to have ever landed in the bottom two more than once, and he remains the most recent winner to do so at all. This series also saw Kevin Clifton reach his fourth consecutive final, a 'Strictly' first.

Professional dancers
On 28 June 2016, the list of professionals who were returning for the fourteenth series was revealed. Professionals from the last series who would not return included last series' and two time professional winner of the show Aliona Vilani, former professional winner Ola Jordan and two time professional finalist Kristina Rihanoff, as well as Gleb Savchenko and Tristan MacManus. Joanne Clifton would partner a celebrity after one series out of the competition. The departing professionals were replaced by Katya Jones and her husband Neil Jones, Burn the Floor dancer Gorka Márquez, former Dancing with the Stars U.S. troupe member Oksana Platero and ex-Britain's Got Talent contestants AJ Pritchard and Chloe Hewitt. Because the professional dancers outnumbered the celebrities, Hewitt and Neil Jones did not partner celebrities, although they were on standby for any pro that may be injured or unable to compete and still did group dances and appear on the Strictly companion programme, It Takes Two.

Couples
On 8 August 2016, former Shadow Chancellor Ed Balls was announced as the first celebrity contestant on the series, with more celebrities being announced throughout the month. The line up was completed on 22 August on The One Show.

On 11 October, singer Will Young announced that he was leaving the show for "personal reasons".

Scoring chart

Average chart

This table only counts for dances scored on a traditional 40-points scale (does not include additional points from the Cha-Cha-Challenge).

Highest and lowest scoring performances of the series
The highest and lowest performances in each dance according to the judges' scale are as follows (scores given by guest judges are deducted from the total).

Couples' highest and lowest scoring dances

Weekly scores and songs
Unless indicated otherwise, individual judges scores in the charts below (given in parentheses) are listed in this order from left to right: Craig Revel Horwood, Darcey Bussell, Len Goodman, Bruno Tonioli.

Launch show
Musical guests: Olly Murs  "You Don't Know Love" and Rebecca Ferguson – "Bones"

Week 1
 Running order (Night 1 – Friday)

Running order (Night 2 – Saturday)

Week 2
Musical guest: Barry Gibb—"In the Now"
 Running order 

Due to an injury, Anastacia & Brendan were unable to participate in the dance-off. Therefore, the couple with the fewest public votes were eliminated.

Week 3: Movie Week
Musical guest: Alfie Boe and Michael Ball—"Somewhere"
 Running order 

Judges' votes to save

Horwood: Laura & Giovanni
Bussell: Tameka & Gorka
Tonioli: Laura & Giovanni
Goodman: Laura & Giovanni

Week 4
Musical guest: Madness—"Mr. Apples"
 Running order 

Judges' votes to save

Horwood: Anastacia & Brendan
Bussell: Anastacia & Brendan
Tonioli: Anastacia & Brendan
Goodman: Did not vote, but would have voted to save Anastacia & Brendan

Week 5
Musical guest: LeAnn Rimes—"How to Kiss a Boy"
 Running order 

1Brendan was unable to dance due to illness, so Anastacia instead danced with Gorka.

2Laura suffered an ankle injury during rehearsals and she and Giovanni were therefore unable to perform on the live show, giving the couple a bye for the week.
Judges' votes to save

Horwood: Daisy & Aljaž
Bussell: Daisy & Aljaž
Tonioli: Daisy & Aljaž
Goodman: Did not vote, but would have voted to save Daisy & Aljaž

Week 6: Halloween Week
Musical guest: Laura Mvula—"Ready or Not"
 Running order 

Judges' votes to save

Horwood: Daisy & Aljaž
Bussell: Daisy & Aljaž
Tonioli: Daisy & Aljaž 
Goodman: Did not vote, but would have voted to save Daisy & Aljaž

Week 7
Musical guest: Gary Barlow—"Dare"
 Running order 

Judges' votes to save

Horwood: Ore & Joanne
Bussell: Ore & Joanne
Tonioli: Ore & Joanne
Goodman: Did not vote, but would have voted to save Ore & Joanne

Week 8
Musical guest: André Rieu and his Orchestra—"Hallelujah"
 Running order 

Judges' votes to save

Horwood: Greg & Natalie
Bussell: Greg & Natalie
Tonioli: Daisy & Aljaž
Goodman: Greg & Natalie

Week 9: Blackpool Week
Musical guest: Simple Minds—"Don't You (Forget About Me)" and Rick Astley—"Dance"
 Running order 

Judges' votes to save

Horwood: Claudia & AJ 
Bussell: Claudia & AJ 
Tonioli: Claudia & AJ 
Goodman: Did not vote, but would have voted to save Claudia & AJ

Week 10
Musical guest: Ellie Goulding—"Still Falling for You"
 Running order 

Judges' votes to save

Horwood: Judge Rinder & Oksana
Bussell: Judge Rinder & Oksana
Tonioli: Judge Rinder & Oksana
Goodman: Did not vote, but would have voted to save Judge Rinder & Oksana

Week 11: Musicals Week (Quarter-final)
Musical guest: Elaine Paige—"Don't Cry for Me Argentina"
 Running order 

Judges' votes to save

Horwood: Ore & Joanne
Bussell: Ore & Joanne
Tonioli: Ore & Joanne
Goodman: Did not vote, but would have voted to save Ore & Joanne

Week 12: Semi-Final
Musical guest: Sting—"One Fine Day"
Running order

For the Dance Off, Danny & Oti chose to dance their American Smooth, while Claudia & AJ chose to dance their Quickstep.

Judges' votes to save

Horwood: Danny & Oti
Bussell: Danny & Oti
Tonioli: Danny & Oti
Goodman: Did not vote, but would have voted to save Danny & Oti

Week 13: Final
Musical guest: Emeli Sandé—"Highs & Lows"
Running order

Dance chart

 Highest scoring dance
 Lowest scoring dance
 Not performed due to injury
 Couple withdrew that week

Week 1: Cha-Cha-Cha, Jive, Paso Doble, Tango or Waltz
Week 2: One unlearned dance (introducing American Smooth, Charleston, Salsa and Viennese Waltz)
Week 3 (Movie Week): One unlearned dance (introducing Quickstep and Samba)
Week 4: One unlearned dance (introducing Foxtrot and Rumba)
Week 5: One unlearned dance
Week 6 (Halloween Week): One unlearned dance
Week 7: One unlearned dance (introducing Argentine Tango)
Week 8: One unlearned dance
Week 9 (Blackpool Week): One unlearned dance
Week 10: One unlearned dance and Cha-Cha-Challenge
Week 11 (Musicals Week): One unlearned dance
Week 12 (Semi-finals): Two unlearned dances
Week 13 (Final): Judges' choice, showdance and couple's favourite dance.

Ratings
Weekly ratings for each show on BBC One. All ratings are provided by BARB.

References

External links

2016 British television seasons
Series 14
2016 in British television